Wolfgang Franz (born 7 January 1944) is a German economist. He is Professor of Economics at the University of Mannheim. Franz also is the chairman of the German Council of Economic Experts since March 2009.

Career
Franz studied economics at the University of Mannheim and received his doctoral degree in 1974, under supervision of Heinz König. He held positions at the University of Mainz, the University of Stuttgart, and the University of Konstanz, before returning to University of Mannheim in 1997.

His research interests include labor markets, macroeconomics and empirical analysis of economics.

Other activities
 Bruegel, Member of the Board 
 Landesbank Baden-Württemberg (LBBW), Member of the Advisory Board (2007-2008)
 German Council for Sustainable Development (RNE), Member (2001-2004, appointed ad personam by Chancellor Gerhard Schröder)

References

External links
 Official biography at the University of Mannheim

1944 births
Living people
University of Mannheim alumni
Academic staff of the University of Stuttgart
Academic staff of the University of Konstanz
Academic staff of the University of Mannheim
German economists